Kipatimu is an administrative ward in Kilwa District of Lindi Region in Tanzania. 
According to the 2012 census, the ward has a total population of 14,606. The ward seat is Kipatimu village. The ward is also home to the Nan'goma Cave system.

References

Wards of Kilwa District
Wards of Lindi Region